Thousand Below is an American rock band from San Diego, California. They are currently signed to Rise Records and Pale Chord and have released three full-length albums and one EP. The band consists of vocalist James Deberg, guitarist Josh Thomas, bassist Josh Billimoria, and drummer Max Santoro.

History

Formation and The Love You Let Too Close (2016-2018) 
Thousand Below was quietly formed in 2016 by vocalist James Deberg, who continued to write music after parting ways with his previous band Outlands. Josh Thomas, guitarist and friend of Deberg, showed him some songs he was working on at the time and the two decided to collaborate. After recruiting other friends and musicians in the area - Josh Billimoria on bass, Devin Chance on guitar, and Garrett Halvax on drums - the band's initial lineup fell into place and they hit the studio to begin recording what would be their debut album, The Love You Let Too Close (2017). After recording some songs, the band began approaching labels behind the scenes, catching the interest of Rise Records. After Rise offered them a deal, the band finished the album and publicly debuted in January 2017 with their first single and music video titled "Tradition" off of The Love You Let Too Close. The second single "Sinking Me" was released with a music video on June 12, 2017. The album was released worldwide on October 6, 2017, charting on the Billboard Independent Albums Chart. The band began touring consistently in North America and Europe from 2017 through 2018 with bands such as The Devil Wears Prada, Dance Gavin Dance, Veil of Maya, Blessthefall and Being As An Ocean. A music video for a song on the album called "Vein" was released on August 29, 2018. Chance and Halvax decided to part ways with the band in December 2018.

Lineup changes and Gone In Your Wake (2019) 
Deberg, Thomas, and Billimoria hit the studio in January 2019 to begin recording their sophomore album, Gone In Your Wake (2019). Without a drummer at the time, they contacted their friend Max Santoro, former drummer of Vesta Collide, to work on the drums for the album and fill in on upcoming tours. The band played Swanfest on March 30, 2019, and embarked on The Artificial Selection Tour with Dance Gavin Dance, Don Broco, Hail The Sun, and Covet in April and May. In the summer of 2019, the band went on tour with Miss May I, The Word Alive and Afterlife, and brought on Santoro as their new full-time drummer. The first single off of Gone In Your Wake, titled "Chemical", was released on July 11, 2019, along with a music video. "Chemical" premiered on SiriusXM Octane, where it remained in rotation for several weeks. In September and October 2019, Thousand Below toured the United States and Canada with Of Mice & Men, For The Fallen Dreams, and Bloodbather. Gone In Your Wake was officially released worldwide on October 11, 2019 and peaked at #32 on Billboard Independent Albums Chart.

Touring in 2020 and Let Go Of Your Love EP (2020) 
The band went on tour in North America once again in February and March 2020 with Bad Omens, Oh, Sleeper, and Bloodline, however, the tour was postponed indefinitely on March 13 due to the ongoing COVID-19 pandemic. All other tours and festivals the band had planned for the year were also postponed or canceled, including a European tour with The Plot In You, and the annual Impericon Festival with As I Lay Dying. During their time in quarantine due to the pandemic, the band recorded an acoustic EP titled Let Go Of Your Love. The EP consists of 4 reworked versions of songs from Gone In Your Wake, as well as an original song that shares the title of the EP. Let Go Of Your Love was released worldwide on August 21, 2020.

Gone To Me single, signing to Pale Chord and Hell Finds You Everywhere (2021-present) 
The band released a single and music video titled "Gone To Me" in February 2021. They toured the UK in the fall of 2021 with Normandie and Caskets, and played their first US headline tour as well as So What Music Festival in May 2022. Another single and music video, titled "Venenosa", was released on May 4, 2022. The band has confirmed via social media that their 3rd studio album is finished. They toured Australia with Ocean Sleeper in August 2022. On September 21, 2022, a new single "Face To Face" was released, along with the announcement that the band had now signed with Pale Chord Music. On November 9, 2022, a new single "Sabotage" was released, along with the unveiling that the upcoming album will be entitled Hell Finds You Everywhere. The album is set to release December 9 and the band will be on The Concrete Jungle Tour in North America with Bad Omens, Dayseeker and Make Them Suffer from November 3 to December 14.

Musical style and influences 
Thousand Below has been described as a post-hardcore band. According to AllMusic, the band utilizes "emotionally charged lyrics, melodic riffage, and combustible breakdowns with the dynamic atmospherics of post-rock."

Band members 

Current members
 James Deberg – vocals (2016–present)
 Josh Thomas – guitar, backing vocals (2016–present)
 Josh Billimoria – bass, production, backing vocals (2016–present)
 Max Santoro – drums (2019–present)

Former members
 Garrett Halvax – drums (2016–2018)
 Devin Chance – guitar (2016-2018)

Timeline

Discography

Studio Albums

Extended Plays

References 

Rock music groups from California
Musical groups from San Diego
Musical groups established in 2016
2016 establishments in California
Metalcore musical groups from California